Tallulah Greive (born 23 October 1997) is a Scottish actress. She is known for her roles as Orla in Our Ladies, Princess Gwen in Cinderella and Lauren in Millie Inbetween.

Early and personal life
Greive was born in Perth, Western Australia in 1997 to parents Elizabeth "Becc" Sanderson, a jazz singer and performer, and Chris Greive, a jazz trombonist, composer and university lecturer. Greive and her parents moved to the United Kingdom when she was 2 and she was raised in Leith, Edinburgh. She has a younger sister, Lola.

Career
Greive's acting career started on stage in 2012, where she played Genie in 1001 Nights at Widow Twankey's B&B. In 2013, she appeared in a further three plays, which were Emily and the Howler's Hollow as Euphemia, Love Bites as Cupid and Let Sleeping Beauties Lie as Flora. The next play she appeared in was Trash Palace as Celeste in 2014. Greive's first television role was in 2012 playing a daughter in an advert for the Royal Bank of Scotland. She played Melissa Albright in series 6 of M.I. High. In 2014, she appeared in an infomercial for the SNP. From 2014 to 2018, she portrayed the role of Lauren in CBBC's Millie Inbetween. In 2021, she played Princess Gwen in Amazon Studios' Cinderella.

Filmography

Stage

References

External links

1997 births
21st-century Australian actresses
21st-century Scottish actresses
Australian child actresses
Australian emigrants to Scotland
Australian expatriates in Scotland
Australian television actresses
Scottish child actresses
British child actresses
Living people
Actresses from Edinburgh
People from Leith
People from Western Australia
Scottish television actresses